A Band Of Angels were a mid-1960s English pop group, featuring Mike d'Abo (vocals, various instruments), John Edward Baker (lead guitar), John Christian Gaydon (vocals, rhythm guitar), Andrew Charles Malcolm Glyn Petre (drums), David Robert Wilkinson (bass guitar). 

Mike d'Abo went to Manfred Mann, while John Gaydon became a manager, involved with King Crimson, Julie Felix, Emerson, Lake & Palmer, T. Rex and Roxy Music in partnership with A Band of Angels former road manager David Enthoven. They later co-founded E.G. Records.

Andrew Petre joined a group called Timebox in the period September 1966 until August 1967.

Discography
1964: Soundtrack album - Just For You (Decca LK 4620) (One song: "Hide 'n' Seek" (Baker/d'Abo))
1964: "Me" (Baker/d'Abo) / "Not True As Yet" (Baker/d'Abo) (United Artists UP 1049)
1964: "She'll Never Be You" (Sedaka/Greenfield) / "Gonna Make A Woman Of You" (d'Abo/Baker) (United Artists UP 1066)
1965: "Leave It To Me" (Pomus/Shuman) / "Too Late My Love" (d'Abo) (Piccadilly 7N 35279)
1966: "Invitation" (d'Abo) / "Cheat And Lie" (Miki Dallon) (Piccadilly 7N 35292)

References

External links
"A Band Of Angels" feature
Mike D'Abo Interview

Musical groups established in 1964
English rock music groups
English pop music groups
Beat groups